Lynne Rossetto Kasper is an American food writer and radio journalist. She was the founding host of the American Public Media program The Splendid Table, whose targeted audience is "people who love to eat."  The weekly program features a series of interviews with chefs, restaurateurs, and wine experts.  Guests vary from week to week, but the show frequently included a segment with food travelers and authors Jane and Michael Stern. During her episode on February 10, 2017, Lynne announced her retirement from The Splendid Table. She has been replaced by former New York Times Magazine food columnist Francis Lam.

In 1993, Kasper won the James Beard Cookbook of the Year Award for her book The Splendid Table: Recipes from Emilia Romagna, The Heartland of Northern Italian Food.  Her radio show has won the prestigious James Beard Award on two occasions: in 1998 for Best National Radio Show and 2008 for Best Radio Food Show.

There is also a tomato variety, a hybrid of Matt's Wild Cherry and Black Krim, named after her.

Bibliography

References

External links
The Splendid Table official website
Lynne Rossetto Kasper is interviewed by Lois Lee, Director of "Cooks of Crocus Hill", Northern Lights Minnesota Author Interview TV Series #258 (1993):  [https://reflections.mndigital.org/catalog/p16022coll38:46#/kaltura_video] 

Year of birth missing (living people)
Living people
American chefs
American food writers
American radio journalists
Women food writers
American women radio presenters
American women radio journalists
American cookbook writers
Women cookbook writers
20th-century American women writers
20th-century American non-fiction writers
21st-century American women writers
James Beard Foundation Award winners
21st-century American non-fiction writers
American women chefs